is the second single by the Japanese idol group HKT48, released on September 4, 2013. It reached number one on the Oricon and Billboard Japan weekly singles chart.

Promotion and release 
"Melon Juice" was released in Japan on September 4, 2013 in four different versions: Type A, Type B, Type C and the Theater.

The centers for the title track were announced to be Meru Tashima and Mio Tomonaga, both of whom are trainees. The title track would also feature five other trainees: Yuka Akiyoshi, Mai Fuchigami, Kanna Okada, Naoko Okamoto, and Marika Tani, the most trainees on a title track for any AKB48 or sister group.

The theater version of the CD features both Tashima and Tomonaga on the cover.

Track listing

Type-A

Type-B

Type-C

Theater Edition

Personnel

"Melon Juice" 
The centers for the title track are Meru Tashima and Mio Tomonaga.
 Team H : Chihiro Anai, Haruka Kodama, Natsumi Matsuoka, Sakura Miyawaki, Madoka Moriyasu, Aoi Motomura, Anna Murashige, Aika Ota, Rino Sashihara
 Kenkyuusei : Yuka Akiyoshi, Mai Fuchigami, Kanna Okada, Naoko Okamoto, Marika Tani, Meru Tashima, Mio Tomonaga

"Kibo no Kairyu" 
Center : Sakura Miyawaki

 Team H : Sakura Miyawaki, Anna Murashige, Aoi Motomura, Aika Ota, Yuki Shimono, Nao Ueki, Haruka Wakatabe
 Kenkyuusei : Yūka Tanaka, Meru Tashima, Mio Tomonaga, Marina Yamada

"Doro no Metronome" 
Center : Haruka Kodama

 Team H: Chihiro Anai, Haruka Kodama, Serina Kumazawa, Natsumi Matsuoka, Madoka Moriyasu, Chiyori Nakanishi, Natsumi Tanaka
 Kenkyuusei: Izumi Goto, Mina Imada, Hiroka Komada, Riko Sakaguchi

"Nami Oto no Orgel" 
 Team H : Haruka Kodoma, Sakura Miyawaki, Rino Sashihara
 Kenkyuusei : Meru Tashima, Mio Tomonaga

Oricon Charts

References 

2013 singles
Japanese-language songs
HKT48 songs
Oricon Weekly number-one singles